This is a list of playwrights either born in Ireland or holding Irish citizenship. Playwrights whose work is in Irish are included. 	

A brief outline of the history of Irish theatre is also available.

A – J

K – Z

See also

Irish literature
List of Irish poets
List of Irish novelists
List of Irish short story writers

Irish dramatists
Dramatists
Irish